I Don't Want to Be Hurt Anymore is a 1964 studio album by Nat King Cole, arranged by Ralph Carmichael. The album reached #18 on Billboards Top LP chart.  I Don't Want to Be Hurt Anymore b/w People was released on Capitol 5155 in 1964 but failed to chart.  I Don't Want to See Tomorrow b/w L-O-V-E peaked at #34 on the Billboard Hot 100 on August 19, 1964 on Capitol 5261. The B-side peaked at #81 on the Billboard Hot 100 on August 26, 1964.

Reception

The Allmusic review by William Ruhlmann awarded the album three stars, and said it "suffered from a lack of strong material and arrangements...with the sad sentiments undercut by relatively quick tempos and a perky backup chorus"

Track listing
 "I Don't Want to Be Hurt Anymore" - 2:29
 "You're Crying On My Shoulder" (Sidney Lippman, Fred Wise) - 2:22
 "Only Yesterday" (Hoagy Carmichael, Bretha Scott) - 2:59
 "I'm Alone Because I Love You" (Ned Miller, Ira Schuster, Al Young) - 1:37
 "Don't You Remember" - 1:57
 "You're My Everything" (Mort Dixon, Harry Warren, Joe Young) - 2:49
 "I Don't Want to See Tomorrow" (Lenwood Morris, Bernie Wayne) - 2:36
 "Brush Those Tears From Your Eyes" (Oakley Haddleman, C. Watts) - 2:46
 "Was That the Human Thing to Do" (Sammy Fain, Joe Young) - 2:46
 "Go If You're Going" (James P. Johnson) - 2:25
 "Road to Nowhere" (Robert Ecton) - 3:07
 "All Cried Out" - 2:01

Personnel
Nat King Cole - vocals
Ralph Carmichael - arranger

References

Capitol Records albums
Albums arranged by Ralph Carmichael
Nat King Cole albums
1964 albums

Albums recorded at Capitol Studios